Escondido Transit Center is a bus and train station located in Downtown Escondido, California. It serves as the current eastern terminus of the North County Transit District's SPRINTER light rail line and the northern terminus of the BREEZE Rapid bus rapid transit line. There are plans to extend the SPRINTER service to the Westfield North County mall in southern Escondido, north of Lake Hodges.

A preview Sprinter service stopped at Escondido Transit Center on December 28, 2007, and regular service commenced March 9, 2008.

The station is located just east of Interstate 15 (accessible from Valley Parkway exit) and south of State Route 78. Parking is available. Express bus service to Downtown San Diego is available at the Escondido Transit Center, as well as local bus service to inland North County San Diego. Flixbus buses between San Diego and Las Vegas stop at the center. Greyhound bus lines running between San Diego and San Bernardino stop next to the facility at 700 West Valley Parkway.

Platforms and tracks

References

External links
SPRINTER Stations

North County Transit District stations
Railway stations in the United States opened in 2008
Escondido, California
2008 establishments in California